Paul Withypoll (by 1485 – 3 June 1547, London) was an English merchant who settled in London and became a Member of Parliament for the City of London.

In 1545, with his son, Edmund Withypoll he bought land in Ipswich.

References

1485 births
1547 deaths